"Cry Wolf" is a song by Norwegian band A-ha, released as the second single from their second studio album, Scoundrel Days (1986).

Background
The lyrics "Night I left the city I dreamt of a Wolf..." are credited to Lauren Savoy, who was later married to the band's guitarist Paul Waaktaar-Savoy.

Commercial performance
"Cry Wolf" was the most successful single from the Scoundrel Days album in the United States, where it peaked at number 14 on the Hot Dance Music/Club Play charts and number 50 on the Billboard Hot 100, though it would be the band's last entry on that chart. The single reached the top 40 in various other countries, including top-five placings in the United Kingdom and Ireland, as well as number two in Norway. The single was certified silver by the British Phonographic Industry (BPI) on 1 January 1987.

Music video
The video was directed by Steve Barron in Couches at the Chateau de Couches, Burgundy, France. The theme of the video was taken from the fable The Boy Who Cried Wolf, which was also the inspiration for the song.

Track listings
UK 7-inch single (Warner Bros. / W 8500)
 "Cry Wolf" (Album Version) - 4:05 
 "Maybe, Maybe" - 2:34

UK 12-inch single (Warner Bros. / W 8500T)
 "Cry Wolf" (Extended Version) - 8:12
 "Cry Wolf" (Album Version) - 4:05 
 "Maybe, Maybe" - 2:34

Charts

Weekly charts

Year-end charts

Certifications

References

1986 singles
1986 songs
A-ha songs
Music videos directed by Steve Barron
Songs written by Magne Furuholmen
Songs written by Paul Waaktaar-Savoy
Warner Records singles
Song recordings produced by Alan Tarney